Mutya ng Pilipinas 2016 was the 48th edition of Mutya ng Pilipinas. It was held at the Newport Performing Arts Theater, Resorts World Manila in Pasay, Metro Manila, Philippines on July 30, 2016.

At the end of the event, Leren Mae Bautista crowned Ganiel Krishnan as Mutya ng Pilipinas Asia Pacific International 2016. Including her crowned are the new court of winners: Justin Mae San Jose was crowned as Mutya ng Pilipinas Tourism International 2016, and Michelle Thorlund was crowned as Mutya ng Pilipinas Overseas Communities 2016. Lynette Bradford was named First Runner-Up, while Ashley Nicole Singh was named Second Runner-Up.

Results
Color keys
  The contestant was a Runner-up in an International pageant.
  The contestant was a Semi-Finalist in an International pageant.
  The contestant did not place.

Special Awards

Major Awards

Sponsor Awards

Contestants
30 contestants competed for the three titles:

References

2016
Mutya ng Pilipinas
2016 in the Philippines